Servify is a device management platform, founded in 2015. It is headquartered in Mumbai, India and operates in North America, Europe, Middle East, China and Turkey. It provides services like product diagnosis, queue management, warranty and protection plans to its clients. In 2019, Servify was featured in Red Herring Asia Top 100 Technology company list.

History 
Servify was founded by Sreevathsa Prabhakar in 2015. Before starting Servify, Prabhakar was running a company called The Service Solutions, which he had started in 2009 and later it was acquired by B2X GmbH, a Germany based customer service outsourcing company.

It received its first round of funding in April 2016 for an undisclosed amount from Blume Ventures, Beenext, Barkawi Holdings and TM Service Technology Holdings.

In June 2016, OnePlus used Servify's technology to launch the 'OnePlus Care' app that allows customers to self-diagnose their smartphones and avail doorstep pickup for service center, if needed repair. The company is also partnered with brands like Apple, Oppo, Panasonic, Realme, Nokia, OnePlus, Xiaomi, Amazon, AmTrust, Croma, Godrej, Huawei, Ingram Micro, Micromax, Motorola, Lenovo, Reliance Jio, Reliance Retail and Vodafone.

Servify raised $15M in its Series B funding round from Iron Pillar, Blume Ventures and Beenext in August 2018. It acquired a gadgets repair startup iService in January 2019.

In June 2020, Samsung tied up with Servify to launch Samsung Care+ that provides protection service for Samsung Galaxy smartphones. It secured Rs. 85.8 crores in its Series C funding round for its existing investors, Iron Pillar and Blume Ventures.

Servify raised $23M in Series C funding round from Iron Pillar, Blume Ventures, Beenext and Tetrao SPF in September 2020. Servify acquired key businesses of German-based WebToGo.

Servify acquires 247Around to strengthen its service fulfilment network beyond smart products.

Servify announces its partnership with Samsung Electronics Canada to roll out its premium protection plan for corporate devices.

Servify raises $65 million as part of its ongoing Series D funding round.

Servify Launches Protect+ with AppleCare Services in India.

Recognition 
  Red Herring Asia Top 100 Winner 2019
 Outlook Business's Power of I 2019 list
 DIA Top 100 Insuretechs 2019
 Businessworld Techtors 2020
 Winner Best Enterprise Product/Service in India Digital Enabler Awards 2020
 Nasscom Emerge50 Awards 2021
 2022 Red Herring Top 100 Global: Winner
 2022 Deloitte Technology Fast 50 India Winner

See also 
 Asurion
 Assurant

References

External links 
 Official website
2015 establishments in Maharashtra
Companies based in Mumbai
Internet properties established in 2015
Privately held companies of India